Chris or Christopher Howard may refer to:

Chris Howard (American football) (born 1975), American football player
Chris Howard (catcher) (Christopher Hugh Howard; born 1966), American baseball catcher
Chris Howard (pitcher) (Christian Hugh Howard; born 1965), American baseball pitcher
Christopher B. Howard (born c. 1969), American college administrator
Christopher R. Howard, American novelist

See also
Christian Howard (disambiguation)